John Kaefer (born October 1, 1976) is a composer for film, television, and the concert stage.

Education
Kaefer is a doctoral graduate of The Juilliard School and also earned degrees in composition from Yale University (MM) and the Eastman School of Music (BM).

Career
Kaefer began his professional television music career during his time at The Juilliard School, where he composed the music for the TV mini-series Dance School: Juilliard. He then went on to compose the scores for several short films, including To Kill A Bore (2006) and They Say It’s Wonderful (2006), and In Pursuit of Woody Allen (2007). In 2007, he provided additional music for another short, Room Service, as well as for his first feature film, Mama’s Boy. He also began working on ABC’s Good Morning America, co-composing the theme music and the rest of the score until 2012. Kaefer also co-composed the music for Good Morning America Weekend Edition.

In 2009, Kaefer composed for another short film, Forget Me Not, and contributed the theme music for Focus Earth with Bob Woodruff. That year, he also composed the thematic music package for ABC’s hour-long news magazine, 20/20.

In 2010, Kaefer composed his second full-length film score for the crime-drama The Rise and Fall of Their American Dream and for another short, Lily of the Feast. He was credited as music programmer and orchestrator for the film One Fall in 2011. In 2012, Kaefer composed for another short, Pandora’s Box, and ended his time with Good Morning America and Good Morning America Weekend Edition.

In 2013, Kaefer provided the theme music for Primetime: Would You Fall for That?. He also scored his first documentary, A Polite Bribe. In 2014, Kaefer worked on the series, Sequestered, the first season of which aired on the Crackle network. He composed the music for his second documentary by Robert Orlando, Silence Patton, the following year in 2015.

Kaefer worked on the score for the live-action sequences of Quantum Break, a third-person shooter action game released for the Xbox One on April 5, 2016. He composed the music for the Fullscreen series, Making Moves, which will be released on April 26, 2016, and he also composed the theme music for The Kidnapping of a Fish, a short set to release later in 2016.

Concert Music 
As a composer for the concert stage, Kaefer's music has been programmed by The Pacific Symphony, Eighth Blackbird, the Aspen Music Festival Contemporary Ensemble, The Juilliard Orchestra, Symphony In C (Haddonfield Symphony), The New York Youth Symphony, the Chamber Symphony of New Jersey and The Yale Philharmonia.

Kaefer has led performances at venues including Carnegie Hall and Lincoln Center in New York, Wigmore Hall in London, and La Schola Cantorum in Paris.

Awards 
In 2000, Kaefer was recipient of the American Academy of Arts and Letters' Charles Ives Scholarship. The following year, he received the Morton Gould Composer Award from the ASCAP Foundation.

Kaefer received the BMI foundation's Student Composer Award in 2002 and the Pete Carpenter Fellowship in 2006. He was also a panelist/advisor to Mike Post for the Pete Carpenter Fellowship from 2007 to 2010.

Kaefer has been a guest composer and instructor in the American Composers Orchestra, Film Music Factory Program and is a member and mentor for the Society of Composers and Lyricists (SCL).

Filmography

Film

Television

Video game

References

External links
 
 Official website

1976 births
21st-century American composers
Living people
Eastman School of Music alumni
Yale University alumni